Goodale may refer to:

People
Dora Goodale (1866-1915), American poet
Elaine Goodale (1863-1953), American poet
George Lincoln Goodale (1839-1923), American botanist
James Goodale (born 1933), former General Counsel and Vice Chairman of The New York Times
Lincoln Goodale (1782-1868), first doctor to live in Columbus, Ohio, United States
Melvyn A. Goodale (born 1943), Canadian neuroscientist
Ralph Goodale (born 1949), Canada's Minister of Public Safety
Robert L. Goodale (1930-2014), American surgeon and philanthropist

Places

 Goodale Creek, a stream in Inyo County, California, U.S.; see Taboose Fire
 Goodale Mountain, a summit in Inyo County, California
 Goodale Park, Columbus, Ohio, U.S.
 Goodale State Park, Camden, South Carolina, U.S.
 Mount Goodale, in the Queen Maud Mountains, Antarctica
 Goodale Glacier, a glacier which flows north from the mountain

See also
 Goodall (disambiguation)